Spiker is an unincorporated community in Washington County, Nebraska.

History
The Spiker General Store was established and the community was set up in 1890. It was named after Samuel Spiker, an early settler.

A post office was opened in 1890, but closed in 1902.

In the late 1930s, the community was damaged by a fire. It was abandoned soon after.

References

Unincorporated communities in Washington County, Nebraska
Unincorporated communities in Nebraska